Joshua Michael Knight (born 7 September 1997) is an English professional footballer who plays as a defender or a midfielder for League One club Peterborough United.

Early life
Knight was born to Sue and Mick and attended Robert Smyth Academy in Market Harborough. He and his family are lifelong Leicester City fans.

Career

Leicester City
Knight began his football at Fleckney Athletic and joined the Leicester City Academy at the age of eight. Knight received his scholarship at the age of sixteen, making numerous appearances for the U18s and signed his first professional contract with the club as he turned 18.

He made his debut for Leicester City on 22 August 2017 in a victory in the Football League Cup away at Sheffield United. On 11 January 2019, Knight was awarded Premier League 2 player of the month for December.

Peterborough United (loan)
On 31 January 2019, Knight signed a new contract with Leicester and joined Peterborough United on loan for the rest of the season. He made his debut for the club against Oxford United on 16 February 2019, but came off injured in the 22nd minute.

On 2 August 2019, Knight re-signed for Peterborough on loan for the 2019–20 season.

Knight scored his first senior goal in a 3–0 victory over Sunderland on 31 August 2019.

Wycombe Wanderers (loan)

He signed a short-term loan with Championship club Wycombe Wanderers on 5 October 2020. On 7 January 2021, this loan spell was extended until the end of the 2020/21 season. He scored his first goal for Wycombe in an FA Cup tie against Preston North End on 9 January 2021.

Knight won both the Supporters’ and Players' Player of the Year awards at the end of the season.

Peterborough United
On 2 July 2021 Knight signed for Peterborough on a permanent deal following two previous loan spells at the club.

Career statistics

References

External links

1997 births
Living people
People from Harborough District
Footballers from Leicestershire
English footballers
Association football defenders
Leicester City F.C. players
Peterborough United F.C. players
Wycombe Wanderers F.C. players
English Football League players